Veronika Windisch (born 9 April 1982 in Graz, Steiermark, Austria) is an Austrian short track speed skater.

Career results
2017
National Track Cycling Championships
2nd Sprint
2nd 500m Time Trial

2022–23
Ice cross downhill
Women's Championships
1st - 1000 points

External links
 Profile from Sports-Reference.com

1982 births
Living people
Austrian female short track speed skaters
Olympic short track speed skaters of Austria
Short track speed skaters at the 2010 Winter Olympics
Short track speed skaters at the 2014 Winter Olympics
Sportspeople from Graz
Austrian female cyclists
Austrian track cyclists
Austrian female speed skaters
21st-century Austrian women